El Alcaraván Airport, also known as El Yopal Airport, is an airport serving the city of Yopal, the capital of the Casanare Department of Colombia. The airport is on the southeast edge of the city.

Although the airport only has domestic flights to Bogotá and Bucaramanga, it is classified as an international airport because it has an immigration facility. El Alcaraván has airport police, hangars, commercial offices, modules, boarding zone, gas station, waiting room and many passenger facilities such as restaurants, cafeterias, and souvenir stores.

The passenger airlines that currently operate flights from and to the city of Yopal are LATAM Airlines Colombia, Avianca and EasyFly, and there were others like Satena that ceased operations in this route. Due to the good economy of the department of Casanare, based on petroleum, there has been an increase in the number of people using the airport; for that reason, it is being remodeled and new routes are being studied by airlines.

History 
In 1965 started the first commercial flights in Yopal when Aerotaxi Casanare S.A. was founded, it was the only airline until 1992 when the Aeronautica Civil allows Aires S.A. to operate in this airport.

In 1996, Ecopetrol, British Petroleum, and others companies were interested in the petroleum that the department has and decided to invest 6100 million pesos for improving the runway and offices with the goal of adapting the airport to allow the Antonov 124 a safe landing.

On 27 November 1996, Ernesto Samper, a former president of Colombia, arrived in a Boeing 707 at El Alcaraván airport to inaugurate the improvements that were made by the oil companies.

In September 2006, the Camara de Comercio de Casanare (Casanare Chamber of Commerce) asked the Ministry of Transport to make El Alcaraván an international airport, because it has all the facilities that are needed, it would increase the economy of the department, and it would let the flights that come from North America and South America refuel.

In 2009 the possibility of El Alcaraván becoming an international airport was studied again; however, so far, the airport only operates domestic flights.

Airlines and destinations 

LAN Colombia: After the purchase of AIRES S.A by LAN Airlines, This airline started to operate flights from Yopal to Bogotá and vice versa under the name of LAN Colombia with a DASH Q-400, a plane that has 50 seats, but a few months later; because of the demand of tickets, they changed that airplane for a Boeing 737-700 with a capacity of 150 passengers. Currently they have three flights a day.

Avianca: Since 2012 Avianca is back, they are offering two flights a day, each one has a capacity for 50 people, but for security, sometimes the flight are restricted and only can be operated with 49 clients on board. Its aircraft is a Fokker 50, but according to the announcement that one of the heads of Avianca in Yopal gave to EXTRA Newspaper they are planning to operate an Airbus A319, this one has 12 seats on business class and 88 on tourist class.

EasyFly: This low cost airline operates a Jet Stream 41 from British Aerospace each plane has 30 seats and the frequency of flights to Yopal is up to 10 a day. It is the airline with more flights.

Satena: Some years ago, this was one of the principal airlines but since 2011 they started to cease their flights, and currently there are no flights to El Alcaraván with Satena.

Airlines that ceased operation

The Antonov 124

In August 1997,the specialized magazine Motor from Bogotá, published an article about the flights that the Antonov, one of the largest airplanes in the world with a capacity of 120 tons, had flown from Ernesto Cortizzos airport in Barranquilla to Yopal in order to deliver machines and material that British Petroleum needed for building oil wells in Casanare. Each trip had a price of 85 million pesos. Owing to the characteristics of this airplane, the runway had to be extended.

Transport
Access to the airport can be made by taxi or bus in only 15 minutes. For the passengers who arrive in Yopal, there are taxis available until midnight.

There are 50 parking spaces at the entrance of the airport for passengers to unload luggage. They are not allowed to wait in front of the terminal for security reasons.

Accidents and incidents
 On 25 October 1976, Douglas C-47 HK-149 of Taxi Aéreo El Venado crashed on approach. The aircraft was on a domestic scheduled passenger flight. Shortly after take-off, the port engine failed and the decision was made to return to El Alcaraván. All 36 people on board were killed.

See also
Transport in Colombia
List of airports in Colombia

References

External links 

El Yopal Airport at OpenStreetMap

Airports in Colombia
Buildings and structures in Casanare Department